Some Assembly Required is a Discovery Channel TV series which premiered in the United States on December 27, 2007 and originally aired in 2007 and 2008. Hosts Brian Unger and physicist Lou Bloomfield explain how various things are manufactured and participate in the manufacturing process. The show is also titled as How Stuff's Made in the UK.

Episodes

Season 1 (2007–2008)

Season 2 (2008)

External links
Official website

Discovery Channel original programming
Documentary television series about industry